Tegostoma confluentalis is a moth in the family Crambidae. It was described by George Hampson in 1913. It is found in Egypt and Iran.

The wingspan is about 26 mm. The forewings are reddish brown, suffused with white at the base and with a white costal edge. The medial band is white and the postmedial line is yellowish white. The hindwings are white, slightly tinged with brown.

References

Odontiini
Moths described in 1913
Moths of Africa
Moths of Asia
Taxa named by George Hampson